The Off the Shelf Festival of Words takes place in Sheffield, England, during October each year. It is organised by the University of Sheffield with support from Arts Council England, Sheffield Hallam University and several commercial companies. The Festival offers a wide range of events for all ages.

History
First held in 1991, the Off the Shelf Festival of Words has become an annual event attracting literature and media personalities to Sheffield. Off the Shelf is one of the United Kingdom's biggest and most significant festivals of writing and reading, combining a selection of authors, poets, journalists and broadcasters. The festival also caters for community and outreach provision, and supports emerging writers, through workshops, exhibitions, storytelling, talks, walks and also runs a programme of events for children and young people.

Previous festivals have included events with

Simon Armitage
Nick Clegg
Carol Ann Duffy
Hugh Fearnley-Whittingstall
Michael Frayn
Stephen Fry
Donna Hilbert
Nick Hornby
Doris Lessing
David Lodge
John Lydon
Paul Merton
Michael Morpurgo
Helen Mort
Andrew Motion
Jamie Oliver
Jodi Picoult
John Pilger
Ian Rankin
Michael Rosen
Prunella Scales
Will Self
Lionel Shriver
Lemn Sissay
David Starkey
Claire Tomalin
Rose Tremain
Benjamin Zephaniah

References

External links
Twitter page

Festivals in South Yorkshire
Literary festivals in England
Events in Sheffield